Ormosia grandistipulata is a species of tree or shrub in the family Fabaceae. It is endemic to Peninsular Malaysia. It is threatened by habitat loss.

References

grandistipulata
Endemic flora of Peninsular Malaysia
Vulnerable plants
Taxonomy articles created by Polbot